Junior Benjamin (born 13 August 1992) is a professional football player from Antigua and Barbuda who plays for the Antigua and Barbuda national team.

He debuted on 1 April 2018 ina a friendly match with Dominica in a 0–0 draw.

On 22 March 2019, Benjamin scored his first goal for Antigua and Barbuda with a 2–1 victory against Curaçao, resulting a qualification spot to League B of the CONCACAF Nations League.

International career

International goals
Scores and results list Antigua and Barbuda's goal tally first.

References

1992 births
Living people
Antigua and Barbuda international footballers
Antigua and Barbuda footballers
Association football forwards